The 1990–91 Asia Cup was the fourth Asia Cup tournament, and was held in India between 25 December 1990, and 4 January 1991. Three teams took part in the tournament: India,  Sri Lanka and Asian leading associate member Bangladesh.  Pakistan had pulled out of the tournament due to strained political relations with India.

The 1990–91 Asia Cup was a round-robin tournament where each team played the other once, and the top two teams qualifying for a place in the final. India and Sri Lanka qualified for the final in which India beat Sri Lanka by 7 wickets to win its second consecutive (and third in total) Asia Cup.

Squads

Matches

Group stage

Final

Statistics

Most runs

Most wickets

See also
 Asia Cup

References

External links
 Tournament page on ESPNcricinfo
 

Asia Cup
Asia Cup
Asia Cup
International cricket competitions from 1988–89 to 1991
International cricket competitions in India
Asia Cup
Asia Cup